Mahasena, also known in some records as Mahasen, was a king of Sri Lanka who ruled the country from 277 to 304 CE. He started the construction of large tanks or reservoirs in Sri Lanka, and built sixteen such tanks. After becoming king, Mahasena discriminated the Buddhists belonging to the Theravada-school and destroyed several of their temples including the Mahavihara (the main Theravada temple) before his chief minister led him to realise his mistakes. He mended his ways and built the Jethavana stupa. Mahasena's countrymen regarded him as a god or deity (deva) after the construction of the Minneriya tank, he became known as Minneri Deviyo (God of Minneriya).

Discrimination against Theravada Buddhism
Mahasena was the younger son of King Gotabaya, who ruled the country from 253 to 266 CE. His elder brother and predecessor to the throne was King Jetthatissa, who was the king from 266 to 275. Mahasen and Jetthatissa were educated by a Buddhist monk named Sanghamitta, who was a follower of the Vaitulya doctrine. Mahasen also became a follower of this doctrine, which was associated with Mahayana Buddhism. Theravada Buddhism was traditionally the official religion of the country. However when Mahasen acquired the throne, he ordered the Bhikkhus of Mahavihara, the largest Theravada temple in the country, to accept Mahayana teachings. When they refused, Mahasen prohibited his countrymen from providing food to the Theravada Bhikkhus, and established a fine for violating this. As a result, the Buddhist monks abandoned Anuradhapura and went to the Ruhuna municipality in the South of the country.

Mahasen destroyed the Mahavihara, and the materials obtained from there were used for building the Jethavanaramaya. Lovamahapaya, which belonged to the Mahavihara, was also destroyed. After this incident, the king’s chief minister and friend, Meghavannabaya, rebelled and raised an army in Ruhuna against him. The king came with his army to defeat Meghavannabaya and camped opposite the rebel camp. On the night before the battle was to be fought, Meghavannabaya managed to enter Mahasen’s camp and convinced him to stop the violence against Theravada Buddhists. Mahasen agreed to stop the violence and made peace with Meghavannabaya, and later reconstructed the Mahavihara.

Constructions

The Jethavana stupa was built by Mahasen in the land belonging to Mahavihara. This is the highest stupa in Sri Lanka, and is among the tallest in the world. He also built other temples such as Gokanna, Minneriya and Kalandaka.

The Mahavamsa,  chronicle of Sri Lanka, states that Mahasen constructed sixteen large tanks and two irrigation canals. The Minneriya tank provides water for a large area, and its water supply is maintained by the Elahara canal. Henry Ward, a governor of Sri Lanka when it was a British crown colony, had stated; 
No wisdom and no power in the ruler can have forced such efforts even upon the most passive oriental nations, without general persuasion that the work was one of paramount necessity and that all would participate in its benefits
The sixteen tanks given in the Mahavamsa as built by Mahasen are as follows. Some of these tanks have been identified, and the present names of the ones that have been identified are given in brackets.
Manihira (Minneriya)
Mahagama
Challura
Khanu
Mahamani
Kokavata
Dhammarama
Kumbalaka
Vahana
Ratmalakandaka (Padawiya)
Tissavadamanaka (Kawudulla)
Velangavitthi
Mahagallaka
Cira
Mahadaragallaka (Nachchaduwa)
Kalapasana

In addition to these, Mahasen also built the canal Pabbathantha ela, and also completed the canal Elahara ela, which was started by King Vasabha.

Relations with the countrymen
During Mahasen’s anti-Theravada campaign, his countrymen turned against him and this opposition even led to rebellions against him. Even the Commander of his army Meghavarnabaya turned against him. These led to the killing of several royal officials, including the monk Sanghamitta, the teacher of the king who led him to this campaign.

However, after Mahasen reconstructed the Mahavihara and constructed and repaired several tanks in order to improve agriculture in the country, the people’s opposition toward him was reduced. After the construction of the Minneriya reservoir, Mahasen was regarded as a god or deity, and was called Minneri Deviyo (God of Minneriya). After his death, a shrine was built for him near the Minneriya reservoir, the remains of which can be seen to this day.

Mahasen died in 301, and with his death, the Mahavamsa written by the Buddhist Monk Mahanama also ends.

See also
 Mahavamsa
 List of Sri Lankan monarchs

References

Further reading

M
Sinhalese Buddhist monarchs
301 deaths
M
Year of birth unknown
M
M
M